The 1896 United States House of Representatives elections were held for the most part on November 3, 1896, with Oregon, Maine, and Vermont holding theirs early in either June or September. They coincided with the election of President William McKinley. Elections were held for 357 seats of the United States House of Representatives, representing 45 states, to serve in the 55th United States Congress. The size of the House increased by one seat after Utah gained statehood on January 4, 1896. Special elections were also held throughout the year.

The Republican Party maintained its large majority in the House but lost 48 seats, mostly to the Democratic and Populist parties. The Republican losses were most likely due to the extraordinary gains that party made in the prior elections, when many normally Democratic districts voted Republican due to the severity of and fallout from the Panic of 1893. The Democratic Party recovered in the Mid-Atlantic and Midwestern districts dominated by Catholic and working-class voters. In the West, the Populist Party made large gains and several Republicans broke away over the national party platform's endorsement of a gold standard.

This election marked the zenith of the Populist Party. The Populists would lose most of their seats in the 1898 elections and thereafter slowly fade from prominence.

Election summaries

Special elections 

|-
! 

|-
! 
| J. William Stokes
|  | Democratic
| 1894
| Incumbent's previous election declared void June 1, 1896 due to electoral fraud.Incumbent re-elected November 3, 1896.Incumbent also elected to the next term, see below.
| nowrap | 

|}

Early election dates
Three states, with 8 seats between them, held elections early in 1896:

June 1: Oregon
September 1: Vermont
September 14: Maine

Alabama 

|-
! 
| Richard Henry Clarke
|  | Democratic
| 1888
|  | Incumbent retired to un for Governor of Alabama.New member elected.Democratic hold.
| nowrap | 

|-
! 
| Jesse F. Stallings
|  | Democratic
| 1892
| Incumbent re-elected.
| nowrap | 

|-
! 
| George Paul Harrison Jr.
|  | Democratic
| 1894
|  | Incumbent retired.New member elected.Democratic hold.
| nowrap | 

|-
! 
| William F. Aldrich
|  | Republican
| 1894
| Incumbent re-elected after initial results indicated loss to Plowman.
| nowrap | 

|-
! 
| Albert Taylor Goodwyn
|  | Populist
| 1894
|  | Incumbent lost re-election.New member elected.Democratic gain.
| nowrap | 

|-
! 
| John H. Bankhead
|  | Democratic
| 1886
| Incumbent re-elected.
| nowrap | 

|-
! 
| Milford W. Howard
|  | Populist
| 1894
| Incumbent re-elected.
| nowrap | 

|-
! 
| Joseph Wheeler
|  | Democratic
| 1884
| Incumbent re-elected.
| nowrap | 

|-
! 
| Truman H. Aldrich
|  | Republican
| 1894
|  | Incumbent retired.New member elected.Democratic gain.
| nowrap | 

|}

Arkansas

California 

|-
! 
| John All Barham
|  | Republican
| 1894
| Incumbent re-elected.
| nowrap | 

|-
! 
| Grove L. Johnson
|  | Republican
| 1894
|  | Incumbent lost re-election.New member elected.Democratic gain.
| nowrap | 

|-
! 
| Samuel G. Hilborn
|  | Republican
| 1894
| Incumbent re-elected.
| nowrap | 

|-
! 
| James G. Maguire
|  | Democratic
| 1892
| Incumbent re-elected.
| nowrap | 

|-
! 
| Eugene F. Loud
|  | Republican
| 1890
| Incumbent re-elected.
| nowrap | 

|-
! 
| James McLachlan
|  | Republican
| 1892
|  | Incumbent lost re-election.New member elected.Populist gain.
| nowrap | 

|-
! 
| William W. Bowers
|  | Republican
| 1890
|  | Incumbent lost re-election.New member elected.Populist gain.
| nowrap | 

|}

Colorado

Connecticut

Delaware

Florida

|-
! 
| Stephen M. Sparkman
|  | Democratic
| 1894
| Incumbent re-elected.
| nowrap | 

|-
! 
| Charles Merian Cooper
|  | Democratic
| 1892
|  | Incumbent retired.New member elected.Democratic hold.
| nowrap | 

|}

Georgia

Idaho 

|-
! 
| Edgar Wilson
|  | Republican
| 1894
|  | Incumbent retired to run for Idaho Supreme Court.New member elected.Populist gain.
| nowrap | 

|}

Illinois

Indiana

Iowa

Kansas

Kentucky

Louisiana

Maine 

|-
! 
| Thomas Brackett Reed
|  | Republican
| 1876
| Incumbent re-elected.
| nowrap | 

|-
! 
| Nelson Dingley Jr.
|  | Republican
| 1880
| Incumbent re-elected.
| nowrap | 

|-
! 
| Seth L. Milliken
|  | Republican
| 1882
| Incumbent re-elected.
| nowrap | 

|-
! 
| Charles A. Boutelle
|  | Republican
| 1882
| Incumbent re-elected.
| nowrap | 

|}

Maryland

Massachusetts 

|-
! 
| Ashley B. Wright
|  | Republican
| 1892
| Incumbent re-elected.
| nowrap | 

|-
! 
| Frederick H. Gillett
|  | Republican
| 1892
| Incumbent re-elected.
| nowrap | 

|-
! 
| Joseph H. Walker
|  | Republican
| 1888
| Incumbent re-elected.
| nowrap | 

|-
! 
| Lewis D. Apsley
|  | Republican
| 1892
|  | Incumbent retired.New member elected.Republican hold.
| nowrap | 

|-
! 
| William S. Knox
|  | Republican
| 1894
| Incumbent re-elected.
| nowrap | 

|-
! 
| William H. Moody
|  | Republican
| 1895 (special)
| Incumbent re-elected.
| nowrap | 

|-
! 
| William Emerson Barrett
|  | Republican
| 1894
| Incumbent re-elected.
| nowrap | 

|-
! 
| Samuel W. McCall
|  | Republican
| 1892
| Incumbent re-elected.
| nowrap | 

|-
! 
| John F. Fitzgerald
|  | Democratic
| 1894
| Incumbent re-elected.
| nowrap | 

|-
! 
| Harrison Henry Atwood
|  | Republican
| 1894
|  | Incumbent lost re-nomination.New member elected.Republican hold.
| nowrap | 

|-
! 
| William F. Draper
|  | Republican
| 1892
|  | Incumbent retired.New member elected.Republican hold.
| nowrap | 

|-
! 
| Elijah A. Morse
|  | Republican
| 1888
| Incumbent re-elected.
| nowrap | 

|-
! 
| John Simpkins
|  | Republican
| 1894
| Incumbent re-elected.
| nowrap | 

|}

Michigan

Minnesota

Mississippi 

|-
! 
| John M. Allen
|  | Democratic
| 1884
| Incumbent re-elected.
| nowrap | 

|-
! 
| John C. Kyle
|  | Democratic
| 1890
|  | Incumbent retired.New member elected.Democratic hold.
| nowrap | 

|-
! 
| Thomas C. Catchings
|  | Democratic
| 1884
| Incumbent re-elected.
| nowrap | 

|-
! 
| Hernando Money
|  | Democratic
| 1892
|  | Incumbent retired.New member elected.Democratic hold..
| nowrap | 

|-
! 
| John S. Williams
|  | Democratic
| 1892
| Incumbent re-elected.
| nowrap | 

|-
! 
| Walter M. Denny
|  | Democratic
| 1894
|  | Incumbent lost renomination.New member elected.Democratic hold.
| nowrap | 

|-
! 
| James G. Spencer
|  | Democratic
| 1894
|  | Incumbent retired.New member elected.Democratic hold.
| nowrap | 

|}

Missouri

Montana 

|-
! 
| Charles S. Hartman
|  | Republican
| 1892
|  |Incumbent re-elected.Silver Republican gain.
| nowrap | 

|}

Nebraska 

|-
! 
| Jesse B. Strode
|  | Republican
| 1894
| Incumbent re-elected.
| nowrap | 

|-
! 
| David H. Mercer
|  | Republican
| 1892
| Incumbent re-elected.
| nowrap | 

|-
! 
| George de Rue Meiklejohn
|  | Republican
| 1892
|  | Incumbent retired.New member elected.Populist gain.
| nowrap | 

|-
! 
| Eugene Jerome Hainer
|  | Republican
| 1892
| | Incumbent lost re-election.New member elected.Populist gain.
| nowrap | 

|-
! 
| William E. Andrews
|  | Republican
| 1894
|  | Incumbent lost re-election.New member elected.Populist gain.
| nowrap | 

|-
! 
| Omer Madison Kem
|  | Populist
| 1890
|  | Incumbent retired.New member elected.Populist hold.
| nowrap | 

|}

Nevada

New Hampshire

New Jersey

New York

North Carolina

North Dakota 

|-
! 
| Martin N. Johnson
|  | Republican
| 1890
| Incumbent re-elected.
| nowrap | 

|}

Ohio

|-
! 
| Charles Phelps Taft
|  | Republican
| 1894
|  | Incumbent retired.New member elected.Republican hold.
| nowrap | 

|-
! 
| Jacob H. Bromwell
|  | Republican
| 1894
| Incumbent re-elected.
| nowrap | 

|-
! 
| Paul J. Sorg
|  | Democratic
| 1894
|  | Incumbent retired.New member elected.Democratic hold.
| nowrap | 

|-
! 
| Fernando C. Layton
|  | Democratic
| 1890
|  | Incumbent retired.New member elected.Democratic hold.
| nowrap | 

|-
! 
| Francis B. De Witt
|  | Republican
| 1894
|  | Incumbent lost re-election.New member elected.Democratic gain.
| nowrap | 

|-
! 
| George W. Hulick
|  | Republican
| 1892
|  | Incumbent lost renomination.New member elected.Republican hold.
| nowrap | 

|-
! 
| George W. Wilson
|  | Republican
| 1892
|  | Incumbent retired.New member elected.Republican hold.
| nowrap | 

|-
! 
| Luther M. Strong
|  | Republican
| 1892
|  | Incumbent lost renomination.New member elected.Republican hold.
| nowrap | 

|-
! 
| James H. Southard
|  | Republican
| 1894
| Incumbent re-elected.
| nowrap | 

|-
! 
| Lucien J. Fenton
|  | Republican
| 1894
| Incumbent re-elected.
| nowrap | 

|-
! 
| Charles H. Grosvenor
|  | Republican
| 1892
| Incumbent re-elected.
| nowrap | 

|-
! 
| David K. Watson
|  | Republican
| 1894
|  | Incumbent lost re-election.New member elected.Democratic gain.
| nowrap | 

|-
! 
| Stephen Ross Harris
|  | Republican
| 1894
|  | Incumbent lost re-election.New member elected.Democratic gain.
| nowrap | 

|-
! 
| Winfield S. Kerr
|  | Republican
| 1894
| Incumbent re-elected.
| nowrap | 

|-
! 
| H. Clay Van Voorhis
|  | Republican
| 1892
| Incumbent re-elected.
| nowrap | 

|-
! 
| Lorenzo Danford
|  | Republican
| 1894
| Incumbent re-elected.
| nowrap | 

|-
! 
| Addison S. McClure
|  | Republican
| 1894
|  | Incumbent lost re-election.New member elected.Democratic gain.
| nowrap | 

|-
! 
| Robert W. Tayler
|  | Republican
| 1894
| Incumbent re-elected.
| nowrap | 

|-
! 
| Stephen A. Northway
|  | Republican
| 1892
| Incumbent re-elected.
| nowrap | 

|-
! 
| Clifton B. Beach
|  | Republican
| 1894
| Incumbent re-elected.
| nowrap | 

|-
! 
| Theodore E. Burton
|  | Republican
| 1894
| Incumbent re-elected.
| nowrap | 

|}

Oregon 

|-
! 
| Binger Hermann
|  | Republican
| 1892
|  | Incumbent retired.New member elected.Republican hold.
| nowrap | 

|-
! 
| William R. Ellis
|  | Republican
| 1892
| Incumbent re-elected.
| nowrap | 

|}

Pennsylvania

Rhode Island

South Carolina

|-
! 
| George W. Murray
|  | Republican
| 1892
|  | Incumbent lost re-election.New member elected.Democratic gain.
| nowrap | 

|-
! 
| W. Jasper Talbert
|  | Democratic
| 1892
| Incumbent re-elected.
| nowrap | 

|-
! 
| Asbury Latimer
|  | Democratic
| 1892
| Incumbent re-elected.
| nowrap | 

|-
! 
| Stanyarne Wilson
|  | Democratic
| 1894
| Incumbent re-elected.
| nowrap | 

|-
! 
| Thomas J. Strait
|  | Democratic
| 1892
| Incumbent re-elected.
| nowrap | 

|-
! 
| John L. McLaurin
|  | Democratic
| 1892
| Incumbent re-elected.
| nowrap | 

|-
! 
| J. William Stokes
|  | Democratic
| 1894
| Incumbent's previous election declared void June 1, 1896 due to electoral fraud.Incumbent re-elected.Incumbent also elected to finish the term.
| nowrap | 

|}

South Dakota 

|-
! rowspan=2 | 
| John Pickler
|  | Republican
| 1889 
|  | Incumbent retired.New member elected.Populist gain.
| rowspan=2 nowrap | 

|-
| Robert J. Gamble
|  | Republican
| 1894
|  | Incumbent lost re-election.New member elected.Populist gain.

|}

Tennessee 

|-
! 
| William C. Anderson
|  | Republican
| 1894
|  |Incumbent lost renomination.New member elected.Republican hold.
| nowrap | 

|-
! 
| Henry R. Gibson
|  | Republican
| 1894
| Incumbent re-elected.
| nowrap | 

|-
! 
| Foster V. Brown
|  | Republican
| 1894
|  |Incumbent retired.New member elected.Democratic gain.
| nowrap | 

|-
! 
| Benton McMillin
|  | Democratic
| 1878
| Incumbent re-elected.
|  nowrap | 

|-
! 
| James D. Richardson
|  | Democratic
| 1884
| Incumbent re-elected.
| nowrap | 

|-
! 
| Joseph E. Washington
|  | Democratic
| 1886
|  |Incumbent retired.New member elected.Democratic hold.
| nowrap | 

|-
! 
| Nicholas N. Cox
|  | Democratic
| 1890
| Incumbent re-elected.
| nowrap | 

|-
! 
| John E. McCall
|  | Republican
| 1894
|  |Incumbent lost re-election.New member elected.Democratic gain.
| nowrap | 

|-
! 
| James C. McDearmon
|  | Democratic
| 1892
|  |Incumbent lost renomination.New member elected.Democratic hold.
| nowrap | 

|-
! 
| Josiah Patterson
|  | Democratic
| 1890
|  |Incumbent lost re-election as a National Democrat.New member elected.Democratic hold.
| 

|}

Texas

Utah

Vermont 

|-
! 
| H. Henry Powers
|  | Republican
| 1890
| Incumbent re-elected.
| nowrap | 

|-
! 
| William W. Grout
|  | Republican
| 1884
| Incumbent re-elected.
| nowrap | 

|}

Virginia

Washington

West Virginia 

|-
! 
| Blackburn B. Dovener
|  | Republican
| 1894
| Incumbent re-elected.
| nowrap | 

|-
! 
| Alston G. Dayton
|  | Republican
| 1894
| Incumbent re-elected.
| nowrap | 

|-
! 
| James H. Huling
|  | Republican
| 1894
|  | Incumbent retired.New member elected.Republican hold.
| nowrap | 

|-
! 
| Warren Miller
|  | Republican
| 1894
| Incumbent re-elected.
| nowrap | 

|}

Wisconsin

Wyoming 

|-
! 
| Frank W. Mondell
|  | Republican
| 1894
|  | Incumbent lost re-election.New member elected.Democratic gain.
| nowrap | 

|}

Non-voting delegates

Oklahoma Territory 

|-
! 
| Dennis T. Flynn
|  | Republican
| 1892
|  | Incumbent lost re-election.New delegate elected.Silver gain.
| nowrap | 

|}

See also
 1896 United States elections
 1896 United States presidential election
 1896–97 United States Senate elections
 54th United States Congress
 55th United States Congress

Notes

References

Bibliography

External links
 Office of the Historian (Office of Art & Archives, Office of the Clerk, U.S. House of Representatives)